Below is a list of Slovak language exonyms for towns and villages in non-Slovak-speaking areas of the World :

Caveat: some of them are only used in historical contexts today (not always marked in the list). A complete list of names that are obligatorily translated into their Slovak equivalents today can be found here:

Albania

Apoloni Apolónia
Durrës Drač
Korçë Korča (rare)
Lezhë Leža
Tiranë Tirana
Shkodër Skadar
Vlorë Valona (rare)

Algeria

Al-Jaza'ir Alžír

Austria

Angern an der March Congr (local)
Bruck an der Leitha Most nad Litavou (hist.)
Dürnkrut Suchá Kruta (local)
Graz Štajerský Hradec (also Graz)
Hohenau Cahnov (local)
Kärnten Korutánsko
Kittsee (hist.) Kopčany
Klagenfurt (hist.) Celovec
Krems (hist.) Kremža
Linz Linec
Neusiedl am See Nezider
Neusiedlersee Neziderské jazero
Salzburg (hist. ) Soľnohrad
Villach (hist.) Belák
Wien Viedeň
Wiener Neudorf Viedenská Nová Ves
Wiener Neustadt Viedenské Nové Mesto

Belgium

Antwerpen Antverpy
Brugge Bruggy
Brussel-Bruxelles Brusel
Liège Lutych

Bulgaria

Pleven Plevno

China

Beijing Peking

Croatia
Dubrovnik Dubrovník (hist.: Ragúza)
Istra Istria
Karlovac Karlovec
Zagreb Záhreb

Cyprus

Lefkosia Nikózia

Denmark

København Kodaň

France

Avignon Aviňon
Crécy Kresčak
Lourdes Lurdy
Metz Mety
Paris Paríž
Reims Remeš
Strasbourg Štrasburg

Germany

Aachen Cáchy (also Aachen)
Bautzen Budyšín
Bayern Bavorsko
Berlin Berlín
Bremen Brémy
Cottbus Chotebuz
Chemnitz Saská Kamenica (rare)
Dresden Drážďany
Frankfurt am Main Frankfurt nad Mohanom
Görlitz Zhorelec
Köln Kolín nad Rýnom
Konstanz Kostnica
Leipzig Lipsko
Lübeck Ľubica (hist.)
Mainz Mohuč (rare)
München Mníchov
Nürnberg Norimberg
Passau Pasov
Plauen Plavno (rare)
Potsdam Postupim
Regensburg Rezno (rare)
Rügen Rujana
Spree Spréva
Stuttgart Štutgart
Trier Trevír
Tübingen Tubinky (hist.)
Usedom Uznojem
Zittau Žitava

Greece

Athina Atény
Ioannina Janina (hist.)
Kérkyra Korfu
Kriti Kréta
Korinthos Korint
Mykénés Mykény
Peiraiás Pireus
Sparti Sparta
Thessaloniki Solún

Hungary

Balassagyarmat Balážske Ďarmoty
Balaton Blatenské jazero, Blatno (hist.) Bolotin
Békéscsaba Békešská Čaba
Bezenye Beziň
Buda Budín
Budapest Budapešť, Pešťbudín
Csákvár Čakvár
Csongrád Čongrad
Csorna Čierna
Debrecen Debrecín
Drégely Drégeľ
Dunaújváros Dunajské Nové Mesto
Eger Jáger
Esztergom Ostrihom, (hist.)  Stregom
Győr Ráb
Kalocsa Kaloča
Kaposvár Kapošvár
Keszthely Blatenský Kostel
Kisvárda Malý Varadín
Komárom (Maď.) Komárno
Kőszeg Kysek/Kysak
Medgyesegyháza Medeš
Miskolc Miškovec
Mohács Moháč
Moson Uhorské Staré Hrady,  Mošon (hist.)  Mošin a Starhrad
Nagykanizsa  (Veľká) Kaniža
Nagymaros Veľký Maroč
Nógrád Novohrad
Pannonhalma (mesto) Rábsky Svätý Martin
Pannonhalma Panónska Hora, (hist.) Panónsky chlm
Pécs Päťkostolie
Pilisszentkereszt Mlynky
Pilisszántó Santov
Salgótarján Šalgov-Tarjany
Sárospatak Blatný Potok
Siklós Šiklóš
Sopron Šopron
Szarvas Sarvaš
Szécsény Sečany
Szeged Segedín
Székesfehérvár Stoličný Belehrad
Szentendre Svätý Ondrej
Szob Sobov
Szolnok Solnok/Solník
Szombathely  Kamenec, Sobotné mesto (hist.) Sabaria
Tihany Tichoň
Tótkomlós Slovenský Komlóš, (hist.) Slovenský Chmeľov
Vác Vacov
Vasvár Vašvár, Železný hrad
Veszprém Vesprém, (hist.) Vesprím
Visegrád Vyšehrad
Zalavár Blatnohrad (hist.)

India

Bangalore Bangalúr
Kolkata Kalkata
Mumbai Bombaj
New Delhi Naí Dillí
Varanasi Benáres

Iran

Tehran Teherán

Israel & Palestinian Territories

Ariha Jericho
Keysaria Cézarea
Lod Lida or Lydda (hist.)
Natzrat Nazaret
Tverya Tiberiada
Yafo Jaffa (hist. Jopa)
Yerushala'im / Al-Kuds Jeruzalem

Italy

Firenze Florencia
Genova Janov
Gorizia Gorica
Milano Miláno
Napoli Neapol
Padova Pádua
Roma Rím
Siracusa Syrakúzy
Taranto Tarent
Torino Turín
Trento Trident
Trieste Terst
Venezia Benátky

Kazakhstan

Almaty Alma-Ata
Aqtöbe Akťubinsk

Latvia

Daugavpils Dvinsk
Liepaja Libava (hist.)

Lebanon

Sūr Týros or Týrus

Lithuania

Vilnius Vilno (hist.)
Kaunas Kovno (hist.)

Moldova

Chişinău Kišiňov
Tighina Bendery

Monaco
Monaco Monako

Mongolia
Ulaanbaatar Ulanbátar

Netherlands

Den Haag Haag
Groningen (hist.) Groninky

People's Republic of China

Běijīng Peking

Poland

Białogard Belehrad
Bydgoszcz Bydhošť
Częstochowa Čenstochová
Katowice Katovice
Kraków Krakov
Nowy Targ Nový Targ / Nový Trh
Oświęcim  Osvienčim
Ruda Śląska Sliezska Ruda
Szczecin Štetín
Szczecinek Nový Štetín
Tarnów Tarnov
Tarnowskie Góry Tarnovice
Warszawa Varšava
Wieliczka Vielička
Wrocław Vroclav (hist. Vratislav)
Zgorzelec Zhorelec

Portugal

Lisboa Lisabon

Romania

Bistriţa Bystrica (hist.)
București Bukurešť
Cluj-Napoca Kluž
Constanţa Konstanca
Galaţi Galac
Iaşi Jasy
Nădlac Nadlak
Oradea (hist.) Veľký Varadín
Piteşti Pitešť
Ploieşti Ploješť
Rodna Rudnava (hist.)
Satu Mare Satmár
Sibiu Sibiň (rare)
Sighetu Marmaţiei Sihoť, Marmarošská Sihoť
Sighişoara Segešvár
Șiria (hist.) Világoš
Târgovişte Trhovište
Timișoara Temešvár
Transilvania Sedmohradsko

Russia

Chelyabinsk Čeľabinsk
Chita Čita
Kaliningrad Kaliningrad, Kráľovec (hist. to 1945)
Kazan Kazaň
Novokuznetsk Novokuzneck
Sankt-Peterburg Petrohrad, Sankt Peterburg
Yekaterinburg Jekaterinburg

Saudi Arabia
Mecca Mekka

Serbia

Beograd Belehrad
Novi Sad Nový Sad
Bački Petrovac Báčsky Petrovec

South Africa

Cape Town-Kaapstad Kapské mesto

Sweden

Stockholm Štokholm

Switzerland

Basel Bazilej
Genève Ženeva

Turkey

Edirne (hist.) Drinopol
İstanbul Istanbul (hist. Carihrad, Konštantínopol)
İzmir (hist.) Smyrna
Silivri Selimbria (hist.)
Trabzon Trapezunt (hist.)
Truva / Troia Trója

Ukraine

Berehove Berehovo
Chernivtsi Černovice
Chornobyl Černobyľ
Kharkiv Charkov
Kyiv Kyjev
Lviv Ľvov
Mukacheve Mukačevo
Rakhiv Rachov
Rivne Rovno
Ternopil Tarnopoľ
Zaporizhia Záporožie

United Kingdom

London Londýn

Vietnam
Thành phố Hồ Chí Minh Hočiminovo mesto

See also 
 Slovak exonyms (Vojvodina)
 List of European exonyms

Notes 

Exonym
Exonym
Exonym
Slovak